Duplessis was a historical television series in Quebec, Canada, that aired in 1978. It tells the story of Maurice Duplessis, the controversial premier of Quebec from 1936 to 1939 and 1944 to 1959. It is one of the most famous mini-series in Quebec television history. The series was written (but not directed) by Oscar-winning film director Denys Arcand, and based in large part on Conrad Black's popular biography. The series contains 7 episodes, each one containing a different historic moment in Duplessis's life and path into power. Duplessis is portrayed by Jean Lapointe.
It is distributed by Radio-Canada and is available on DVD.

Cast

 Jean Lapointe - Maurice Duplessis
 Gabriel Arcand - Ti-Bi Chamberland
 Rolland Bédard - Maurice Thinel
 Roger Blay - Adélard Godbout
 Yvon Bouchard - Maurice Hamelin
 Jean Brousseau - Paul Gouin
 Yvan Canuel - Mgr Georges Cabana 
 René Caron - Onésime Gagnon
 Raymond Cloutier - Daniel Johnson
 Gilbert Comptois - J.A. Coté
 Pierre Curzi - Le reporter
 Robert Desroches - S. Dufresne
 Denis Drouin - E. Tétreault
 Patricia Nolin : Auréa Cloutier
 Jacques Tourangeau - Oscar Drouin
 Marcel Sabourin - Joseph-Damase Bégin

See also 
 List of Quebec television series
 Television of Quebec
 Culture of Quebec
 Politics of Quebec
 History of Quebec

External links 
Duplessis on IMDB

Television shows set in Quebec
1970s Canadian television miniseries
Ici Radio-Canada Télé original programming
Canadian political drama television series
1977 films